= Domed =

Domed can have several meanings:

- Dome - in architecture
- Domed consonant - a consonant type classified by domed tongue shape
